Lagerstroemia intermedia is a species of plant in the family Lythraceae. It is found in China and Thailand. It is threatened by habitat loss. As of 2010, it was classified as "Vulnerable" on the International Union for Conservation of Nature's Red List.

References

intermedia
Flora of China
Flora of Thailand
Trees of China
Trees of Thailand
Vulnerable flora of Asia
Taxonomy articles created by Polbot